Assabaska is a Saulteaux First Nation reserve in northwestern Ontario on Lake of the Woods. It is shared between the Big Grassy First Nation and the Ojibways of Onigaming First Nation.

References

External links
Canada Land Survey System

Saulteaux reserves in Ontario
Communities in Rainy River District